Erica andevalensis is a species of erica that is native to the Iberian Peninsula, occurring in a small area between southeastern Portugal and southwestern Spain. The species is unusual in that it mostly occurs in metal-contaminated sois, often in mining areas.

References

andevalensis
Flora of Portugal
Flora of Spain
Plants described in 1980